Chelifer cancroides, the house pseudoscorpion, is a species of pseudoscorpion. It is cosmopolitan, synanthropic and harmless to humans.

Subspecies
There are two subspecies:
 Chelifer cancroides cancroides (Linnaeus, 1758)	 
 Chelifer cancroides orientalis (Morikawa, 1954)

Description
Chelifer cancroides measure  in length. The pedipalps are very long, measuring  when extended. The body is teardrop-shaped and has a rich mahogany color. The abdomen has 12 segments, only 10 of which are easily visible. The cephalothorax has one pair of eyes.

This species can be distinguished from other Cheliferidae by a number of features. The carapace has large setose tubercles. In males, the carapace and tergites I-VII or I-VIII have distinct lateral keels. The cheliceral hand has 4 setae, lacking seta sbs. The tarsal claws of adults have a lateroventral process, except for those on the first leg pair of adult males. Additionally, the suberminal tarsal setae are denticulate. In males, coxa IV is strongly arcuate, has a large lateral process, and has a coxal sac lacking a differentiated atrium. The male genitalia have rams horn organs and an anteriorly invaginated lateral rod forming a median depression, in which lies a sclerotic rod. The female genitalia have paired spermathecae and paired median cribriform plates.

Diet 
Chelifer cancroides feeds on small arthropods such as psocids, fruit flies and Varroa mites.

Reproduction
Males maintain small mating territories, few centimeters in size. When a female enters the territory, the male initiates a mating dance and eventually deposits a spermatophore, which is then picked up by the females. Fecundity is 20–40 eggs. The development from egg stage into maturity takes 10 to 24 months and involves three molts; molting may involve building a silk nest. They usually live three or four years.

Distribution 
Chelifer cancroides has been observed in North America, Europe, Africa, and Australia.

Habitat 
Chelifer cancroides has been found under bark of trees, in caves, in bird nests and bee nests, and riding on bats, flies and hymenopterans. It also occurs in human structures such as houses, stables, barns, chicken coops and bee hives.

Venom 
Like some other pseudoscorpions, C. cancroides has venomous pedipalps used for subduing prey. This venom contains various peptides and is toxic to bacteria (e.g. methicillin resistant Staphylococcus aureus), fungi, arthropods (e.g. aphids and Varroa mites) and mammalian cells.

References

External links 

Arachnids of North America
Cheliferidae
Cosmopolitan arthropods
Animals described in 1758
Taxa named by Carl Linnaeus